Mihaela Lăcătuș is a Romanian female boxer. At the 2012 Summer Olympics, she competed in the Women's lightweight competition, but was defeated in the first round.

References

Romanian women boxers
Year of birth missing (living people)
Living people
Olympic boxers of Romania
Boxers at the 2012 Summer Olympics
Lightweight boxers